Philippe de Clermont (1831–1921)  was a French organic chemist. He was known for the synthesis of the first organophosphate cholinesterase inhibitor (tetraethyl pyrophosphate, TEPP). He worked in Adolphe Wurtz's laboratory in Paris.

Published works 
 Recherches sur les composés octyliques (1870).
 Application du sulfure de manganèse comme conleur plastique (1890).

References

 

1831 births
1921 deaths
Organic chemists
20th-century French chemists
19th-century French chemists